Peräseinäjoki is a former municipality of Finland.

It was located in the province of Western Finland and is part of the Southern Ostrobothnia region. The municipality had a population of 3,653 (2004) and covered an area of 459.13 km2 of which 14.11 km2 was water. The population density was 8.2 inhabitants per km2. Peräseinäjoki merged with the town of Seinäjoki on January 1, 2005.

The municipality was unilingually Finnish.

History 

The first travellers at the areas of Peräseinäjoki have most likely been hunters from the northern parts of Satakunta and from Tavastia. The first permanent inhabitants are estimated to be arrived at the 16th century and the population was 149 according to census figures on year 1750. Peräseinäjoki separated from Ilmajoki and formed its own municipal administration on 1868.

Today 
Nowadays, Peräseinäjoki is best known of its steel industry, Kalajärvi and sports tradition.
There is The Finnish Emigrant Museum, The Finnish Emigration Center in Peräseinäjoki. The center will document and present the history and the present-day of emigration, immigration and internal migration. The task of the center will also be collecting, preserving, researching and setting out material concerning migration. The Emigrant Center will act as a meeting place and an information center for those who are interested in internationality and those who are searching their roots.

Notable residents
 Vieno Simonen (1898–1994), Finnish politician and farmer
 Ville Ritola was a 5-time Olympic gold medal winner in long-distance running.

Villages 

 Kihniä
 Luoma
 Peräseinäjoki
 Viitala
 Haapaluoma
 Juupakylä
 Siltala

References

External links 

 Peräseinäjoki

Populated places disestablished in 2009
2005 disestablishments in Finland
Seinäjoki
Former municipalities of Finland